Yevhen Rudakov club is an unofficial list of Soviet and Ukrainian football goalkeepers that have achieved 100 or more clean sheets during their professional career in top Soviet and Ukrainian league, cup, European cups, national team and foreign league and cup. This club is named after the first Soviet (Ukrainian) goalkeeper to achieve 100 clean sheets - Yevhen Rudakov.

Which clean sheets are counted 
Traditionally, counted goals and clean sheets in the following matches:

 UL - goals scored in top leagues of Ukrainian football competitions.
 UC - goals in Ukrainian Cup and Supercup scored in the stages where top league teams participate.
 EC - goals scored in European Champion Clubs Cup, UEFA Champions League, UEFA Europa League, UEFA Cup, Cup Winners Cup and Intertoto Cup for both home and foreign clubs.
 NT - goals scored for national and olympic teams of Ukraine, USSR, CIS in the official matches.
 SL - goals scored in top leagues of Soviet football competitions..
 SC - goals in Soviet Cup and Supercup scored in the stages where top league teams participate.
 FL - goals scored in top leagues of foreign football competitions: Argentina, Armenia, Austria, Azerbaijan, Belarus, Belgium, Brazil, Bulgaria, China, Croatia, Cyprus, Czech Republic, Denmark, England, Finland, France, Georgia, Germany, Greece, Hungary, Italy, Israel, Japan, Kazakhstan, Mexico, Moldova, Netherlands, Norway, Poland, Portugal, Romania, Russia, Serbia, Scotland, Slovakia, Slovenia, South Korea, Sweden, Spain, Switzerland, Turkey, United States, Uzbekistan
 FC - goals in foreign Cup and Supercup scored in the stages where top league teams participate: Argentina, Armenia, Austria, Azerbaijan, Belarus, Belgium, Brazil, Bulgaria, China, Croatia, Cyprus, Czech Republic, Denmark, England, Finland, France, Georgia, Germany, Greece, Hungary, Israel, Italy, Japan, Kazakhstan, Mexico, Moldova, Netherlands, Norway, Poland, Portugal, Romania, Russia, Serbia, Scotland, Slovakia, Slovenia, South Korea, Sweden, Spain, Switzerland, Turkey, United States, Uzbekistan

Yevhen Rudakov Club 
As of June 22, 2015 

Players still playing are shown in bold.

Candidates 
These players may become members of Oleh Blokhin club soon:

Players still playing are shown in bold.

See also
Oleh Blokhin club
Serhiy Rebrov club
Timerlan Huseinov club
Lev Yashin club
Grigory Fedotov club

References

  Yevhen Rudakov club

Ukrainian football trophies and awards
Lists of association football players
Association football goalkeepers
Association football player non-biographical articles